Ethan Ross (born 15 August 2001) is a Scottish professional footballer who plays as a midfielder for Raith Rovers. He has previously played for Aberdeen and had previous loan spells at Dunfermline Athletic and Raith Rovers.

Career

Aberdeen

Ross joined Aberdeen when he was 10 years old, and was the captain of their Under-18 side. He made his first team debut for Aberdeen on 29 January 2019, coming off the bench at Stenhousemuir in a Scottish Cup replay. On 9 March 2019, he made his league debut, again coming off the bench in an away match against Celtic. He signed a new two-year contract in May 2019.

Ross joined Dunfermline Athletic on loan in January 2020.

In October 2020, Ross signed for Raith Rovers on loan. He was recalled by Aberdeen in January 2021. Ross was offered a new contract by Aberdeen, but he decided to leave the club at the end of the 2020/21 season.

On 14 October 2021, Ross signed for Raith Rovers on a permanent deal. Having failed to sign a contract at Southampton and agreeing a compensation fee with former club Aberdeen, he became an "immediate impact" at Raith scoring three goals in his first six matches.

Career statistics

Personal life
He is the younger brother of Seb Ross who plays in midfield for Forfar Athletic F.C; their family runs a bakery business in Inverurie.

Honours
 Raith Rovers
Scottish Challenge Cup : 2021-22

References

External links

2001 births
Living people
Scottish footballers
Aberdeen F.C. players
Association football midfielders
Scottish Professional Football League players
Scotland youth international footballers
Footballers from Aberdeenshire
People from Inverurie
Dunfermline Athletic F.C. players
Raith Rovers F.C. players